Leptospermum lamellatum is a species of shrub or small tree that is endemic to inland Queensland and has distinctive reddish, layered bark. It has narrow elliptical leaves, white flowers and small fruit that fall from the plant when mature.

Description
The main stems have layers of papery, reddish bark. Younger stems are thin and covered at first with silky hairs. Flowering mainly occurs from August to November and the fruit is a capsule  in diameter with the remains of the sepals attached, but the fruit fall from the plant shortly after reaching maturity.

Taxonomy
Leptospermum lamellatum was first formally described in 1989 by Joy Thompson in the journal Telopea, based on plant material collected from Bedourie Station in 1963. The specific epithet (lamellatum) refers to the unusual bark of this species.

Distribution and habitat
This tea tree grows in woodland, among rocks and near watercourses in inland Queensland, from the White Mountains National Park to near Millmerran.

References

lamellatum
Myrtales of Australia
Flora of Queensland
Plants described in 1989